Valeria Zorzetto (born 21 April 1969 in Vicenza) is an Italian paralympic athlete that won a medals at the 2004 Summer Paralympics.

Biography
During her career she has participated in three editions of the Paralympic Games.

See also
Italy at the 2012 Summer Paralympics

References

External links
 

1969 births
Italian female table tennis players
Table tennis players at the 2004 Summer Paralympics
Table tennis players at the 2008 Summer Paralympics
Table tennis players at the 2012 Summer Paralympics
Paralympic table tennis players of Italy
Medalists at the 2004 Summer Paralympics
Paralympic medalists in table tennis
Paralympic silver medalists for Italy
Sportspeople from Vicenza
Living people